W24 is a South Korean idol rock band signed to J Army Entertainment. The quartet consists of leader and guitarist Kim Yun-soo, drummer Kim Jong-gil, vocalist Cheong Ho-won and keyboardist Park Aaron. Formed in 2018, they released their debut mini-album Singing Dancing and promoted various songs from the record. By the end of the year, the band received the Focus Award at the Asia Artist Awards and traveled to Chile to become the first K-pop group to appear at the Teletón charity event. W24's second mini-album Stay a Moment was issued the following year. They released a string of singles throughout 2020. The bassist Park Ji-won left the band on December 27, 2020.

History
Kim Jong-gil, the drummer and original leader of W24, had close ties with the CEO of J Army Entertainment. He attended Seoul Institute of the Arts, where he met keyboardist Park Aaron, bassist Park Ji-won, and guitarist Kim Yun-soo. After graduating from the institution, Kim Jong-gil brought together his fellow three alumni together upon recommendation by the CEO to form a band. The four practiced together for two years. Cheong Ho-won was added to the lineup eight months prior to the band's debut upon successfully auditioning to become its vocalist. He joined the group because he wanted to "touch people's hearts". W24 was formed as a idol quintet. The name is short for World 24 Hours, expressing the band's desire for their music to be heard for 24 hours around the world. Other group name considerations included One Way, Luminant, and Royal Family.

Preceding their first mini-album, W24 released the track "Love Me". Their debut mini-album Singing Dancing and its lead single "Always Missing You" were released on March 8, 2018. The band included songs that they felt were "easy and accessible" to a general audience. They embarked on followup promotions for "Everything Is Fine" and the title track. They released the digital single Sosime on October 29. The lyrics describe a timid and introverted man, a reflection of the band members. W24's work earned them the Focus Award at the 2018 Asia Artist Awards. The band traveled to Chile and appeared at the annual Teletón charity event, becoming the first K-pop group to do so. The disco-funk single "Solfamiredo" was released one month ahead of the band's second mini-album. Stay a Moment and its title track of the same name were released on August 1, 2019. W24 released a string of singles throughout 2020, including "Joahaeyo" and "Sunday Night". In November, W24 entered to compete in the reality competition show Asian Top Band. The group eventually finished in first place, winning the final title of "1st Asian Top Band". Park Ji-won terminated his contract with J Army and he left the band on December 27.

On March 8, 2021, W24 released a digital single titled "Breath" to mark the third anniversary of their debut.

On April 4, 2022, W24 released their first studio album White Album and its lead singles "Revelations" and "J♡B = Love".

Musical style
W24 has creative control over their music. All the members contribute to the lyrics, composition, arrangement, and record production of their records. Their debut mini-album Singing Dancing comprised acoustic tracks, while "Sosime" saw the band incorporate a more rock-oriented sound. W24 has cited The 1975 as their role model, highlighting the English band's balance between synthesizer-based music and acoustic sound.

Members
List of members and instruments.
 Kim Yun-soo – leader, guitar
 Kim Jong-gil – drums
 Cheong Ho-won – vocals
 Park Aaron – keyboard

Former members
 Park Ji-won – bass

Discography

Studio albums

Extended plays

Live albums

Singles

As lead artist

Awards and nominations

! 
|-
! scope="row"|2018
| W24
| Asia Artist Awards – Focus Award
| 
| style="text-align:center;"|
|}

References

External links
 

K-pop music groups
Musical groups established in 2018
Musical groups from Seoul
Musical quintets
South Korean idol groups
South Korean rock music groups
2018 establishments in South Korea